Revenge of the Middle-Aged Woman is a 2004 television drama film directed by Sheldon Larry and starring Christine Lahti, Brian Kerwin, Bryan Brown, and Abby Brammell.

Plot 
Rose, a middle-aged woman who is married Nathan Lloyd loses her job and her husband to her assistant Mindy. Her life gets broken, then she runs into Australian businessman, Hal Thorne, an old love.

Cast
Christine Lahti as Rose
Brian Kerwin as Nathan Lloyd
Abby Brammell as Mindy 
Bryan Brown as Hal Thorne

External links

2004 television films
2004 films
2004 drama films
American films about revenge
Television films based on books
American drama television films
2000s English-language films
Films directed by Sheldon Larry
2000s American films